Alfred Stewart may refer to:

 Alf Stewart, fictional character in Home and Away
Alfred Walter Stewart, British chemist and part-time novelist
Alf Stewart (boxer) from Len Johnson (boxer)
Alfie Stewart from List of Sadie J characters